Sar Tuf (also Romanized as Sar Tūf; also known as Sargūf) is a village in Donbaleh Rud-e Jonubi Rural District, Dehdez District, Izeh County, Khuzestan Province, Iran. At the 2006 census, its population was 51, in 7 families.

References 

Populated places in Izeh County